Skipped Parts is a film in the genre of melodrama, which premiered on September 16, 2010. It is the third feature film directed by Andrey Kavun after the Piranha and Kandagar.

Plot
School friends Maksim, Kiril, Dasha and Leya face the changes that come with adulthood. As they begin to experience love and sex, mistakes and disappointments, betrayal and self-sacrifice, they learn to build relationships and discover something new and not always pleasant in themselves.

Cast
 Dmitry Kubasov as Kiril
 Pavel Priluchny as  Maksim	
 Lyanka Gryu as  Darya
  as Leya
Oleksiy Gorbunov as passenger

Awards and nominations
  Russian Guild of Film Critics: Best Actress (Anna Starshenbaum)  —  nom
 Odesa International Film Festival: Best Film; People's Choice Award  —  win
: Best Actress (Anna Starshenbaum)  —  win

References

External links 

 Детям до 16... on KinoPoisk

Films directed by Andrey Kavun
Russian romantic drama films
2010 romantic drama films
2010 films
2010s Russian-language films